The nundinae, sometimes anglicized to nundines, were the market days of the ancient Roman calendar, forming a kind of weekend including, for a certain period, rest from work for the ruling class (patricians).

The nundinal cycle, market week, or 8-day week ( or ) was the cycle of days preceding and including each nundinae. These were marked on fasti using  from A to H. The earliest form of the Roman calendar is sometimes said to have included exactly 38 such cycles, running for 304 days from March to December before an unorganized expanse of about 50 winter days. The lengths of the Republican and Julian calendars, however, were not evenly divisible by 8; under these systems, the nundinae fell on a different letter each year. These letters formed the basis of the later Christian dominical letters.

Name
It is now glossed as an adjective modifying an understood  ("festival; holiday"), but not all Romans considered it to be one: a writer named Titius listed the nundinae as a "customary occasion" and the Roman pontiffs themselves told the augur Messala that they did not consider the nones or nundinae to be religious occasions. Like  and the names of most other recurring days of the Roman calendar,  always appeared as a plural in classical Latin, even in references to a single day. The English form "nundine", following French , similarly appeared only as a plural at first, although it is now used in the singular number for individual days. In Roman inscriptions, the word was abbreviated .

The form  for the span between the nundinae seems to have been standard in early Latin, but only appears in compounds (&c.) and phrases in the classical period.

The name of the 8-day cycle is based upon the Latin word for "nine" because the Romans tended to count dates inclusively. Each nundinae was thought to follow the next after a 9-day interval because the first day was included in the count.

History

The Etruscans also celebrated an 8-day week which may have been the basis of the Roman system. They supposedly used each day for royal audiences and councils with their various kings. According to Macrobius, the people of the Roman countryside were first obliged to gather in the city on the nones of each month, about a week after the new moon, to hear from the king or his equivalent what the holy days would be and what they were to do over the course of the coming month. The regular nundinae were credited by Roman legend variously to Romulus when he ruled jointly with Titus Tatius and first established Rome's religious observances, to Servius Tullius when he aimed to improve commerce in the town, or to the plebeians when they began to gather after the expulsion of Tarquin to offer sacrifices to Servius Tullius. Macrobius relates that the prohibition against the nundinae occurring on months' nones arose out of concern that these plebeians visiting the city would cause trouble out of remembrance of the popular Servius Tullius, since it was supposedly generally known that his birthday fell on one of the nones but it was uncertain which.

All patrician business was originally suspended during the nundinae but it seems to have been  by the time of the Twelve Tables and, among its provisions, the Hortensian Law of 287BC permitted their use for most legal and business purposes. Dates otherwise permitted for public assemblies were still downgraded if a nundinae occurred on them.

The theoretical proscriptions concerning the nundinae were not always observed. The rebellion of M. Aemilius Lepidus in 78BC was later remembered as an example of the pernicious effects of having the nundinae occur on the January kalends; the New Year was allowed to coincide with a market again in 52BC. Cicero complains in one of his letters about a  being held in the Circus Flaminius despite the nundinae. Following the 46BC Julian reform of the calendar, the inalterable nature of its leap day intercalation meant that the nundinae began to fall upon the supposedly unlucky days of 1 January and the nones of each month. Early on in the Julian calendar, though, the strength of this superstition caused the priests to insert an extra day as under the former system; it was accommodated by removing another day sometime later in the year; this seems to have occurred in 40BC and AD44.

The nundinae of the late Republic and early Empire were possibly centered on the Circus Flaminius.

The 7-day week first came into use in Italy during the early imperial period. For a time, both systems were used together, but the nundinae are seldom mentioned in extant sources after the Julio-Claudian period. Different scholars have placed the end of 8-day markets at various dates from the late 1st to early 5th centuries.

Observance
The nundinal cycle formed a rhythm within quotidian Roman life. Farmers and craftsmen from Rome's hinterland would rest from work on the nundinae to visit the city, selling groceries and supplies which the Romans or their slaves would purchase for the next eight days. Auctions were held. Children and adolescents were exempted from school. The church authorities later issued similar admonitions concerning its clerics, priests, and bishops. Nundinae were used for dinner parties and public announcements, especially of coming assemblies and legislation. Later writers praising early Rome's rusticity and spartanness claimed that its farmers would busy themselves with labor during the week and only groom and fully bathe on the nundinae. Pliny describes the superstition, "religiously believed by many", that trimming one's nails silently during the nundinae or doing so beginning with the index finger provoked bad luck for one's finances. The nundinae were not the only markets at Rome, though, as there were both daily markets and periodic fairs.

Under its monarchy, Rome's nundinae were market days for the country plebeians and used as an occasion for the king to settle disputes among them. Supposedly, retail trading was long restricted to foreigners or slaves out of concern for its spiritual effects.

Under the Republic, the gatherings on the nundinae were overseen by the aediles. The days were originally  upon which no patrician business could be conducted. Plebeians, however, seem to have continued to use them as a time to settle disputes among themselves and to convene their own institutions. This was emended somewhat by the Hortensian Law in the early , which made plebiscites binding on the whole population. If plebeian assemblies had previously been permitted on market days, any public assemblies—including their informal sessions—were now positively banned. At the same time, these provisions meant that the nundinae now could be used for sessions of the Senate. Trebatius noted that officials could free slaves and render judgments on nundinae.

The nundinal cycles were an important pattern in the business of the Centuriate Assembly. All proposed legislation or official appointments were supposed to be publicly announced three weeks in advance. The tribunes of the plebs were obliged to conduct and conclude all of their business on the nundinae, such that if any motion was not carried by dusk it needed to be proposed and announced anew and discussed only after a further three-week period. This was occasionally exploited as a kind of filibuster by the patricians and their clients.

Although their religious nature was never very pronounced, the nundinae were allegedly dedicated to Saturn and Jupiter. The flaminica, the wife of Rome's high priest of Jupiter, offered a ram to that god at each nundinae. Inscriptions have been discovered from cults to both Jupiter Nundinarius and Mercury Nundinator. Superstitions arose about the ill luck when a nundinae would fall upon January 1st or the nones of any month and the pontiffs who controlled the calendar's intercalation until the Julian reform took steps to avoid such coincidences, usually by making the year 354 instead of 355 days long by removing a day from February or the intercalary month. Since the nones were definitionally eight days before each ides, this also had the unstated effect of avoiding nundinae on them as well. Macrobius's account of the origins of these superstitions is unsatisfying, however, and it is more likely that 1 January was avoided because its status as a general holiday was bad for business and the nones because of the ill luck attending their lack of a tutelary deity.

Outside Rome
The 8-day nundinal cycle also seems to have been observed elsewhere in Italy, particularly Campania, as attested in stone calendars and graffiti, as at Pompeii. There are records from the imperial period of towns and villas petitioning for the right to hold such markets. Such a right seems to have been universally granted to the capitals of Italy's prefectures but also extended to some smaller localities where markets were necessary for local trade. These local fairs used the same calendrical system as Rome's, marking out the days of the year into cycles from A to H, but each town or village in an area typically used a separate day, permitting itinerant traders to attend each in turn.

A pre-existing system of rural markets in North Africa's Maghreb was also glossed by the Romans as a system of nundinae, although it did not necessarily occur at eight-day intervals. In the 3rd and 4th century, the annual fairs in Mesopotamia were also known as nundinae.

Legacy
The early Roman prejudice against commerce, especially the retail trade of the nundinal markets, means that the nundinae are usually referenced in negative contexts in Latin literature, particularly for the buying and selling of things that should not be sold such as virginity and love, medical treatment, education, government and church offices and favors, and judicial decisions. This bias endured into medieval Latin, where  ("marketing") without other qualification meant corruption, especially the purchase of judicial verdicts.

Although nundinae are known to have been manipulated during the late republican and imperial period, moved a day forward or backward to avoid interference with a religious festival or important public assembly, they are thought to have been absolutely fixed at eight days under the republic. Scholars therefore use them when trying to find Julian or Gregorian dates for events in Roman history.

See also
 Roman calendar
 Week & Eight-day week
 Day of the week
 Dominical letters
 Runic calendar

Notes

References

Citations

Bibliography
 .
 .
 .
 .
 .
 .
 .
 .
 .
 .
 .
 .
 .
 .
 .
 
 .
 .
 .
 .
 .
 . 
 .
 .
 .
 .
 .
 .
 .
 .
 .
 .

Roman calendar